The Landauer formula—named after Rolf Landauer, who first suggested its prototype in 1957—is a formula relating the electrical resistance of a quantum conductor to the scattering properties of the conductor.
In the simplest case where the system only has two terminals, and the scattering matrix of the conductor does not depend on energy, the formula reads

where  is the electrical conductance,  is the conductance quantum,  are the transmission eigenvalues of the channels, and the sum runs over all transport channels in the conductor. This formula is very simple and physically sensible: The conductance of a nanoscale conductor is given by the sum of all the transmission possibilities that an electron has when propagating with an energy equal to the chemical potential, . 

See also 
Ballistic conduction

References
 

Mesoscopic physics
Quantum mechanics
Nanoelectronics